Hednota crypsichroa is a moth in the family Crambidae. It was described by Oswald Bertram Lower in 1893. It is found in Australia, where it has been recorded from Victoria.

References

Crambinae
Moths described in 1893